Callitriche heterophylla, commonly called twoheaded water-starwort, is a species of flowering plant in the family Plantaginaceae. It is native to North America, where it found in the north from Greenland to Alaska, south to Mexico. It is widespread in the United States. Its natural habitat is in a wide variety of wetlands, including ponds, streams, and mudflats. It is typically found in areas of still or slow moving water.

Callitriche heterophylla is an aquatic plant, growing almost entirely submerged except for its floating stem tips. It produces minutely small flowers throughout the growing season.

References

heterophylla